Lepetodrilus atlanticus is a species of small, deep-sea sea snail, a hydrothermal vent limpet, a marine gastropod mollusk in the family Lepetodrilidae.

Distribution
This species occurs on hydrothermal vents and seeps of the Mid-Atlantic Ridge.

Description 
The size of the shell varies between 2.5 mm and 7.5 mm.

The maximum recorded shell length is 7.2 mm.

Habitat 
Minimum recorded depth is 840 m. Maximum recorded depth is 3520 m.

References

External links
 

Lepetodrilidae
Gastropods described in 2001